Jason Johnson is an American political scientist, commentator and writer. He is the author of the book Political Consultants and Campaigns: One Day to Sell. Johnson is an associate professor of communication and journalism at Morgan State University. He is a regular political contributor to MSNBC and CNN.

Education 
Johnson earned his B.A. in government from the University of Virginia, followed by an M.A. and Ph.D. in political science from the University of North Carolina at Chapel Hill.

Career
Johnson is currently a tenured associate professor in the School of Global Journalism and Communication at Morgan State University in Baltimore, Maryland, where he teaches courses focused on political and international journalism. Johnson formerly was a professor of political science and communications at Hiram College in Hiram, Ohio, where he taught American politics, comparative politics, campaign management and communications. In October 2010, Johnson was named the politics editor for The Source. He also served as politics editor of The Root until early 2020.

Johnson is the author of Political Consultants and Campaigns: One Day to Sell.

Johnson served as campaign manager on legislative races in Virginia, South Carolina and Maryland. In the field of international and comparative politics, Johnson worked on the 2000 London mayoral election, and as an international election monitor in Mexico and South Africa.

Johnson has been quoted on politics by The Wall Street Journal, The Hill, The Cincinnati Enquirer, Akron Beacon Journal, and The Plain Dealer. He has also appeared in the online edition of Essence and Black Enterprise.

Johnson is a frequent television commentator locally, nationally and internationally. He is a regular commentator on MSNBC, 
Al Jazeera English and has appeared on Fox News Channel's The O'Reilly Factor. In Ohio, Johnson is a regular political commentator on WKYC and WOIO in Cleveland, WKBN-TV, and WYTV in Youngstown.

Johnson makes regular radio appearances on WHYY-FM in Philadelphia, WCPN in Cleveland, The Basheer Jones Show on WERE, and CKNW in Vancouver, British Columbia. He has appeared on NPR's Morning Edition and All Things Considered.

Johnson is a paid contributor on MSNBC. He was temporarily "benched" in February 2020 after referring to female African American supporters of 2020 Democratic presidential candidate Bernie Sanders as being from “the Island of Misfit Black Girls”. He was also fired from his position at The Root because of the comment. Johnson has made several other noteworthy statements regarding the 2020 United States presidential election during his time on MSNBC. In January 2019, Johnson stated that Sanders's presidential campaign was done and that he would drop out by August. Additionally, in February 2020, Johnson asserted that billionaire presidential candidate Michael Bloomberg is not an oligarch, prompting Saagar Enjeti of The Hill to characterize Johnson as a "professional wrong person". Johnson returned to MSNBC in July 2020 and remains a regular political panelist.

References

External links 

Year of birth missing (living people)
Place of birth missing (living people)
African-American academics
American political scientists
Hiram College faculty
Living people
Morgan State University faculty
MSNBC people
University of North Carolina at Chapel Hill alumni
University of Virginia alumni